Sympherobius elegans is a species of lacewings.

References

Hemerobiiformia
Insects described in 1836